Billy Butler may refer to:

 Billy Butler (baseball) (born 1986), U.S. Major League Baseball player
 Billy Butler (DJ) (born 1942), English DJ from Liverpool
 Billy Butler (footballer) (1900–1966), English footballer, scorer for Bolton Wanderers in the 1929 FA Cup Final 
 Billy Butler (guitarist) (1925–1991), U.S. soul jazz guitarist
 Billy Butler (singer) (1945–2015), U.S. soul singer

See also
Bill Butler (disambiguation)
William Butler (disambiguation)